The 26th New York State Legislature, consisting of the New York State Senate and the New York State Assembly, met from January 25 to April 6, 1803, during the 2nd year of George Clinton's second tenure as Governor of New York, in Albany.

Background
Under the provisions of the New York Constitution of 1777, amended by the Constitutional Convention of 1801, 32 Senators were elected on general tickets in the four senatorial districts for four-year terms. They were divided into four classes, and every year eight Senate seats came up for election. Assemblymen were elected countywide on general tickets to a one-year term, the whole assembly being renewed annually.

In 1797, Albany was declared the State capital, and all subsequent Legislatures have been meeting there ever since. In 1799, the Legislature enacted that future Legislatures meet on the last Tuesday of January of each year unless called earlier by the governor.

At this time the politicians were divided into two opposing political parties: the Federalists and the Democratic-Republicans.

Elections
The State election was held from April 27 to 29, 1802. Senators John Schenck (Southern D.) and Solomon Sutherland (Middle D.) were re-elected. Joseph Annin, Matthias B. Tallmadge, George Tiffany (all three Western D.); and Assemblymen Abraham Adriance (Middle D.), Asa Danforth and Jacob Snell (both Western D.) were also elected to the Senate. All eight were Democratic-Republicans.

Sessions
The Legislature met at the Old City Hall in Albany on January 25, 1803; and adjourned on April 6.

Dem.-Rep. Thomas Storm was re-elected Speaker. Solomon Southwick (Dem.-Rep.) was elected Clerk of the Assembly with 42 votes against 31 for the incumbent James Van Ingen (Fed.).

On February 1, 1803, the Legislature elected Theodorus Bailey (Dem.-Rep.) to the U.S. Senate, to succeed Gouverneur Morris (Fed.).

On February 8, 1803, the Legislature elected Abraham G. Lansing (Dem.-Rep.) State Treasurer, to succeed Robert McClellan (Fed.).

State Senate

Districts
The Southern District (6 seats) consisted of Kings, New York, Queens, Richmond, Suffolk and Westchester counties.
The Middle District (8 seats) consisted of Dutchess, Orange, Ulster, Columbia, Delaware, Rockland and Greene counties.
The Eastern District (7 seats) consisted of Washington, Clinton, Rensselaer, Albany, Saratoga and Essex counties.
The Western District (11 seats) consisted of  Montgomery, Herkimer, Ontario, Otsego, Tioga, Onondaga, Schoharie, Steuben, Chenango, Oneida, Cayuga and Genesee counties.

Note: There are now 62 counties in the State of New York. The counties which are not mentioned in this list had not yet been established, or sufficiently organized, the area being included in one or more of the abovementioned counties.

Members
The asterisk (*) denotes members of the previous Legislature who continued in office as members of this Legislature. Abraham Adriance, Asa Danforth and Jacob Snell changed from the Assembly to the Senate.

Employees
Clerk: Henry I. Bleecker

State Assembly

Districts

Albany County (6 seats)
Cayuga County (3 seats)
Chenango County (4 seats)
Clinton County (1 seat)
Columbia County (4 seats)
Delaware County (2 seats)
Dutchess County (7 seats)
Essex County (1 seat)
Genesee and Ontario counties (3 seats)
Greene County (2 seats)
Herkimer County (3 seats)
Kings County (1 seat)
Montgomery County (5 seats)
The City and County of New York (9 seats)
Oneida County (4 seats)
Onondaga County (2 seats)
Orange County (4 seats)
Otsego County (4 seats)
Queens County (3 seats)
Rensselaer County (5 seats)
Richmond County (1 seat)
Rockland County (1 seat)
Saratoga County (4 seats)
Schoharie County (2 seats)
Steuben County (1 seat)
Suffolk County (3 seats)
Tioga County (1 seat)
Ulster County (4 seats)
Washington County (6 seats)
Westchester County (4 seats)

Note: There are now 62 counties in the State of New York. The counties which are not mentioned in this list had not yet been established, or sufficiently organized, the area being included in one or more of the abovementioned counties.

Assemblymen
The asterisk (*) denotes members of the previous Legislature who continued as members of this Legislature. Stephen Lush changed from the Senate to the Assembly.

Employees
Clerk: Solomon Southwick
Sergeant-at-Arms: Ephraim Hunt
Doorkeeper: Benjamin Whipple

Notes

Sources
The New York Civil List compiled by Franklin Benjamin Hough (Weed, Parsons and Co., 1858) [see pg. 108f for Senate districts; pg. 118 for senators; pg. 148f for Assembly districts; pg. 176 for assemblymen]
The History of Political Parties in the State of New-York, from the Ratification of the Federal Constitution to 1840 by Jabez D. Hammond (4th ed., Vol. 1, H. & E. Phinney, Cooperstown, 1846; pages 184ff)
Election result Assembly, Columbia Co. at project "A New Nation Votes", compiled by Phil Lampi, hosted by Tufts University Digital Library
Election result Assembly, Dutchess Co. at project "A New Nation Votes"
Election result Assembly, Greene Co. at project "A New Nation Votes"
Election result Assembly, Herkimer Co. at project "A New Nation Votes"
Election result Assembly, Queens Co. at project "A New Nation Votes"
Election result Assembly, Rensselaer Co. at project "A New Nation Votes"
Election result Assembly, Schoharie Co. at project "A New Nation Votes"
Election result Assembly, Steuben Co. at project "A New Nation Votes"
Election result Assembly, Washington Co. at project "A New Nation Votes"
Election result Assembly, Westchester Co. at project "A New Nation Votes"
Partial election result Senate, Southern D. at project "A New Nation Votes" [gives only votes from Richmond and Westchester co.]
Partial election result Senate, Middle D. at project "A New Nation Votes" [gives only votes from Columbia, Delaware, Dutchess and Greene co.]
Partial election result Senate, Western D. at project "A New Nation Votes" [gives only votes from Schoharie and Steuben co.]

1802 in New York (state)
1803 in New York (state)
026
1802 U.S. legislative sessions